Sir William Alexander Bodkin  (28 April 1883 – 15 June 1964) was a New Zealand politician of the United Party, and from 1936, the National Party.

Biography

Early life
Bodkin was born in Queenstown in 1883.

Political career

He was Chairman of Committees from 1930 to 1931.  He was Minister of Civil Defence in the War Administration in 1942. In the Holland Ministry of the First National Government, he was Minister of Internal Affairs (1949–1954) and Minister of Social Security (1950–1954).

In 1935, he was awarded the King George V Silver Jubilee Medal, and in 1953 he was awarded the Queen Elizabeth II Coronation Medal. He was appointed a Knight Commander of the Royal Victorian Order in 1954.

In 1955, Bodkin was granted the use of the title of "Honourable" for life, having served more than three years as a member of the Executive Council.

Notes

References

|-

|-

New Zealand National Party MPs
Members of the Cabinet of New Zealand
New Zealand Liberal Party MPs
1883 births
1986 deaths
United Party (New Zealand) MPs
Members of the New Zealand House of Representatives
New Zealand MPs for South Island electorates
New Zealand Knights Commander of the Royal Victorian Order